Tom Holland is an English actor who has appeared in 28 films and television series.

Filmography

Film

Television

Web series

Theatre

Theme park attractions

Video games

Awards and nominations

Notes

References

External links
 

Lists of awards received by British actor
British filmographies
Male actor filmographies